The pool stage of the 2002–03 Heineken Cup.

Pool 1

Pool 2

Pool 3

Pool 4

Pool 5

Pool 6

Seeding

See also
 2002-03 Heineken Cup

References

External links
 Heineken Cup Fixtures ERC

Heineken Cup pool stages
Pool Stage